Tahir Khan (born 7 September 1997) is an Afghan cricketer. He made his List A debut for Speen Ghar Region in the 2017 Ghazi Amanullah Khan Regional One Day Tournament on 10 August 2017. He made his Twenty20 debut for Amo Sharks in the 2017 Shpageeza Cricket League on 11 September 2017. He made his first-class debut for Speen Ghar Region in the 2017–18 Ahmad Shah Abdali 4-day Tournament on 20 October 2017.

References

External links
 

1997 births
Living people
Afghan cricketers
Spin Ghar Tigers cricketers
Cricketers from Kabul